Nutfield is a locality in Victoria, Australia, 30 km north-east of Melbourne's Central Business District, located within the Shire of Nillumbik local government area. Nutfield recorded a population of 158 at the 2021 census.

History
Nutfield Post Office opened around October 1911 and closed in 1964.

See also
 City of Whittlesea – Parts of Nutfield were previously within this local government area.
 Shire of Eltham – Parts of Nutfield were previously within this former local government area.

References

Shire of Nillumbik